The Drama Desk Award for Outstanding Book of a Musical is an annual award presented by Drama Desk in recognition of achievements in the theatre among Broadway, Off Broadway and Off-Off Broadway productions. For two years, in addition to the award for Outstanding Book, an award was presented to the writers of the Most Promising Book. Recipients of this honor were Melvin Van Peebles for Ain't Supposed to Die a Natural Death in 1972 and Ron House and Diz White for El Grande de Coco-Cola in 1973.

Winners and nominees

1970s

1980s

1990s

2000s

2010s

2020s

Multiple wins

 3 wins
 James Lapine
 Thomas Meehan
 Hugh Wheeler

 2 wins
 Rupert Holmes

Multiple nominations

 5 nominations
Terrence McNally

 4 nominations
James Lapine
Thomas Meehan

 3 nominations
Joe DiPietro
Michael John LaChiusa
Dick Scanlan
John Weidman
Hugh Wheeler
Alfred Uhry

 2 nominations
Douglas Carter Beane
Chad Beguelin
Scott Brown
Harvey Fierstein
John Guare
Rupert Holmes
Anthony King
Jonathan Larson
Warren Leight
Jim Lewis
Bob Martin
Marsha Norman
Lynn Nottage
Peter Stone
Jeff Whitty
Doug Wright

See also 

 Tony Award for Best Book of a Musical

References

External links
 Drama Desk official website

Musical Book